Princeton Senior High School is located in Princeton, West Virginia and is the largest high school in Mercer County. The school is located at 1321 Stafford Drive in Princeton.

Demographics
As of the 2020–21 school year, the school had an enrollment of 908 students and 57.50 classroom teachers (on an FTE basis), for a student–teacher ratio of 15.79:1.

Extracurricular activities and clubs
The organizations, clubs, and extracurricular activities of Princeton High School include focuses on student interests (such as art and music), fundraising and community service (such as Key Club), and other activities. The school also offers band, Center Stage, show choir, and Madrigal singer classes.

Clubs include Key Club, Interact Club, Art Club, Pep Club, National Honor Society, Model UN, Students Against Destructive Decisions, and Future Business Leaders of America.

Sports
Princeton High School offers football, basketball, baseball, golf, tennis, track, cross-country, softball, volleyball, wrestling, and soccer among their sports programs. The 2012 baseball team won the state championship 7 to 4 against Nitro High School. The Tigers won the AAA Basketball titles in 1979 and 1981.

Events
The school also changed its grading/ranking policy in an effort to align it with the rest of the state of West Virginia. This was also changed in an effort to promote fairness to students taking more challenging courses. AP courses are worth a 5.0, honors are now worth 4.5, and regular classes are worth a 4.0.  As of 2009, there were seven Advanced Placement courses in the school: AP Biology, AP Chemistry, AP Calculus AB, AP English Language and Composition, AP English Literature, AP United States History, and AP Studio Art.

Notable alumni

Stephen Murphy (civil servant)

Ethan Howard (audio engineer )

References

External links
 
 Mercer County Board of Education Website
 West Virginia Board of Education 2005-2006 Report Card
 Street map from Google Maps

Public high schools in West Virginia
Schools in Mercer County, West Virginia
Princeton, West Virginia